Mochlozetidae is a family of mites and ticks in the order Sarcoptiformes. There are about 12 genera and at least 50 described species in Mochlozetidae.

Genera
 Calugarella J. & P. Balogh, 1992
 Dynatozetes Grandjean, 1960
 Gephyrazetes Hirauchi, 1999
 Mahunkazetes J. & P. Balogh, 1992
 Mochlobates Norton, 1984
 Mochloribatula Mahunka, 1978
 Mochlozetes Grandjean, 1930
 Nesiotizetes Jacot, 1934
 Paralobozetes Tseng, 1984
 Podoribates Berlese, 1908
 Unguizetes Sellnick, 1925
 Uracrobates Balogh & Mahunka, 1967

References

Further reading

 
 
 
 

Acariformes
Acari families